Chickahominy may refer to
 Chickahominy people, a Native American tribe
 Chickahominy River, a river in eastern Virginia
 Chickahominy, a neighborhood in Greenwich, Connecticut